Nová Ves u Nového Města na Moravě is a municipality and village in Žďár nad Sázavou District in the Vysočina Region of the Czech Republic. It has about 700 inhabitants.

Etymology
The name literally means "New Village near New Town in Moravia". It is the longest name of a municipality in the Czech Republic, with 26 letters and 7 spaces.

References

Villages in Žďár nad Sázavou District